Mannal is a coastal hamlet on the west side of Hynish Bay, on the island of Tiree, Scotland. The township of Mannal lies on the southwest corner of Tiree at the southern end of Hynish Bay between Hynish and Balemartine. Tiree is the most westerly island in the Inner Hebrides which lie off the west coast of Scotland.

References 

Villages on Tiree